Every Knee Shall Bow is a Christian metal band that is currently independent. The band consists of brothers guitarists Drew and Cole, bassist Shane, and drummer DJ Wibblesman, as well as returning vocalist Chris Hull. The band's debut EP was mixed by Rocky Gray of Living Sacrifice, Evanescence, and Machina. The band was recommended in an interview with Gray and Jon Dunn of Soul Embraced about the local Arkansas metal scene. Their debut album was released on March 12, 2013. It was produced by Josh Barber (Norma Jean, Hands, Colossus).

History 

The band started in 2002 with the older brothers, Drew and DJ Wibblesman, (at the time ages, 16 and 11). In 2008, their younger brothers Cole and Shane (ages 9 and 8) joined them, when the band officially formed. Tanner Ramsey was a part of the band in 2008 until 2010, when vocalist Chris Hull joined in November 2010.

The band recorded their debut EP in 2012, which was mixed by Rocky Gray of Living Sacrifice. In 2013, the band recorded their debut album, Slayers of Eden, which was produced by Josh Barber (Norma Jean, Hands, Your Memorial) and released through Rottweiler Records. In 2014 they toured with Abated Mass of Flesh. Hull left the band later in October. and was replaced by Luke Carlson. Carlson left the band in 2015, to get married. The band left Rottweiler Records in early 2016. On November 6, 2018, the band released their first single since their debut in 2013, five years later, with the track "Birth".

Members
Current
 Drew Wibblesman – lead guitar, clean vocals (2002–present)
 Cole Wibblesman – rhythm guitar (2008–present)
 Shane Wibblesman – bass (2008–present)
 DJ Wibblesman – drums (2002–present)
 Chris Hull – lead vocals (2010–2014, 2015–present)

Former
 Tanner Ramsey – lead vocals (2008-2010)
 Luke Carlson – lead vocals (2014–2015)

Timeline

Discography
Studio albums
 Slayers of Eden (March 12, 2013; Rottweiler)

EPs
 Weary Warriors (March 23, 2012; Rottweiler)

Singles
 "Birth" (November 6, 2018)
 "Rise" (August 18, 2020)

References

Musical groups established in 2008
American Christian metal musical groups
Rottweiler Records artists
Metalcore musical groups from Arkansas